The Theneeswarar Temple is a Hindu temple dedicated to Shiva located in Vellalore, near Coimbatore city in Coimbatore District, western part of Tamil Nadu in state of southeastern India.
The temple is also referred as Sri Sivakama Sundari Ambal Samedha Sri Theneeswarar Temple.

References

Hindu temples in Coimbatore district